House Creek is a  long 1st order tributary of Crabtree Creek in Wake County, North Carolina.

Course
House Creek rises in western Raleigh, North Carolina and flows northeast to meet Crabtree Creek near Crabtree Valley Mall. The watershed is about 50% forested.

Watershed
House Creek drains  of area and is underlaid by the Crabtree terrane geologic formation.  The watershed receives an average of 46.5 in/year of precipitation and has a wetness index of 389.18. The watershed is about 12% forested.

See also
List of rivers of North Carolina

References

External links
 House Creek Greenway Trail (City of Raleigh)

Rivers of North Carolina
Rivers of Wake County, North Carolina
Tributaries of Pamlico Sound